This is a list of Rajput clans of Uttar Pradesh. A clan is a group of people united by actual or perceived kinship and descent. Even if lineage details are unknown, clan members may be organized around a founding member or apical ancestor. The kinship-based bonds may be symbolic, whereby the clan shares a "stipulated" common ancestor that is a symbol of the clan's unity. When this "ancestor" is non-human, it is referred to as a totem, which is frequently an animal.

Rajput (from Sanskrit raja-putra, "son of a king") is a member of the patrilineal clans of the Indian subcontinent. They rose to prominence from the late 6th century CE, and, until the 20th century, the Rajput rulers dominated many regions of central and northern India, including the eastern regions of present-day Pakistan.

Rajput clans of Uttar Pradesh
Suryavanshi 
Dikhit
Vishen
Som/Soam/Somvanshi
Rajkumar
Pratihar
Panwar
Tomar
Gehlot
Shorgir 
Kachhwaha
Bandhalgoti
Chandel
Baruwar
Bahrelia
Shrinet / Srinet / Bansgaon
Bhati
Paliwar 
Nanwag (Nandwak) Rajputs
Bais
Dhakrey
Kaushik
Dor
Jadaun
Jhotiyana Rajput ( Subclan of Kachwaha Rajput)
Pundir
Sisodia
Sengar 
singraur
Nagavanshi
Rathore
Gautam
Gaur
Katheria
Kinwar(also spelled as Kenwar)
Sakarwar
Chauhan
Jayas
Badgujar
 Kalhans

See also

 Caste
Caste system in India
 Rajputs in Bihar

References

Rajputs
Ethnic groups in India
Rajput clans of Uttar Pradesh